The 1935 Clemson Tigers football team was an American football team that represented Clemson College in the Southern Conference during the 1935 college football season. In their fifth season under head coach Jess Neely, the Tigers compiled a 6–3 record (2–1 against conference opponents), finished fourth in the conference, and outscored opponents by a total of 147 to 99.

Henry Shore was the team captain. The team's statistical leaders included tailback Joe Berry with 422 passing yards and 457 rushing yards and fullback Mac Folger with 36 points scored (6 touchdowns).

Two Clemson players were selected as first-team players on the 1937 All-Southern Conference football team: tackle Tom Brown and guard Clarence Inabinet.

Schedule

References

Clemson
Clemson Tigers football seasons
Clemson Tigers football